West Leicester  is a farming community in the Canadian province of Nova Scotia, located on Highway 204 Cumberland County. Approximately 22 km East of the NB border, it is the home of Leicester Volunteer Fire Department, known for its annual Easter pancake and maple brunch fundraiser. The location also of several businesses, Carter's Auction Services, Dickie's Firewood & Maple sales, Dickie's Meats (Provincially Inspected Abattoir), Maple Lane - Wendell & Gerry Smith's maple production. Also, blueberry fields, Christmas trees, and cattle.

References
West Leicester on Destination Nova Scotia

Communities in Cumberland County, Nova Scotia
General Service Areas in Nova Scotia